Helvete can refer to:
"Helvete", the Swedish and Norwegian word for hell
Helvete (album), album by Swedish band Nasum
Helvete (store), record shop in Oslo, Norway, related to the early Norwegian black metal scene

See also
Helvetic